The Australian Brandenburg Orchestra (ABO) is an Australian period instrument orchestra specialising in the performance of baroque and classical music.

Founders 
The orchestra's founder and artistic director is Paul Dyer.

In 2013 Dyer was appointed an Officer of the Order of Australia (AO) for his "distinguished service to the performing arts, particularly orchestral music as a director, conductor and musician, through the promotion of educational programs and support for emerging artists". In 2003 Paul was awarded the Australian Centenary Medal for his services to Australian society and the advancement of music and in 2010 the Sydney University Alumni Medal for Professional Achievement.

The other founder and current managing director is Bruce Applebaum.

History 
The orchestra was formed in 1989 by Paul Dyer and Bruce Applebaum and their name pays tribute to the Brandenburg Concertos of J. S. Bach, who was central to the Baroque period.

Since the beginning in 1989, the orchestra has become the leading voice in the Australian cultural landscape due to the purity of their work when compared with the Australian Chamber Orchestra and Sydney Symphony Orchestra.

The group under Paul Dyer and Bruce Applebaum's leadership commenced life as the Brandenburg Ensemble, then as the Brandenburg Orchestra, and finally the Australian Brandenburg Orchestra.  Its first concert was in January 1990, in the Concert Hall of the Sydney Opera House.

Venues and Programming 
The orchestra has hired the Sydney City Recital Hall as its main venue since it opened in 2000. This venue was custom made for the ABO.   The group makes regular appearances in the major concert halls and cultural venues in Australian east coast cities of Brisbane and Melbourne.

The Orchestra's name pays tribute to the Brandenburg Concertos of J.S. Bach, whose musical genius was central to the Baroque era, as Paul Dyer is today. The concerts include both the music of well-known composers such as Mozart, Vivaldi and Handel, as well as lesser-known composers, rare works and unusual replica instruments. The musicians always play from original edition scores on replica instruments of the 18th century.

The group has performed with guest artists such as Andreas Scholl, Emma Kirkby, Derek Lee Ragin, Andrew Manze, Philippe Jaroussky, Avi Avital, Dmitry Sinkovsky, Federico Guglielmo, Christina Pluhar and Elizabeth Wallfisch. Every December, the orchestra plays O Come All Ye Faithful and Stille Nacht in churches across Sydney, which is a highlight for families across the Eastern and Northern suburbs.

Discography

Charting albums

Awards and nominations

AIR Awards
The Australian Independent Record Awards (commonly known informally as AIR Awards) is an annual awards night to recognise, promote and celebrate the success of Australia's Independent Music sector.

|-
| AIR Awards of 2015
|Brandenburg Celebrates 
| Best Independent Classical Album
| 
|-
| AIR Awards of 2017
| Brandenburg Celebrates
| Best Independent Classical Album
| 
|-

ARIA Music Awards
The ARIA Music Awards is an annual awards ceremony that recognises excellence, innovation, and achievement across all genres of Australian music. They commenced in 1987. 

! 
|-
| 1993
| The Brandenburg Orchestra
|rowspan="9" | Best Classical Album
| 
|rowspan="9" |
|-
| 1995
| Handel: Opera Arias (with Graham Pushee & Paul Dyer)
| 
|-
| 1998
| Handel: Arias (with Yvonne Kenny & Paul Dyer)
| 
|-
| 1999
| If Love's a Sweet Passion (with Sara Macliver & Paul Dyer)
| 
|-
| 2001
| Vivaldi – Ii Flauto Dolce (with Genevieve Lacey & Paul Dyer)
| 
|-
| 2005
| Sanctuary
| 
|-
| 2009
| Handel: Concerti Grossi Opus 6 (with Paul Dyer)
| 
|-
| 2010
| Tapas – Tastes of the Baroque (with Paul Dyer)
| 
|-
| 2015
| Brandenburg Celebrates
| 
|-

References

External links
Australian Brandenburg Orchestra (official website)

ARIA Award winners
Australian orchestras
Early music orchestras
Musical groups established in 1989